NGC 4458 is an elliptical galaxy located about 54 million light-years away in the constellation of Virgo. It was discovered by astronomer William Herschel on April 12, 1784. NGC 4458 is a member of Markarian's Chain which is part of the Virgo Cluster. It is in a pair with the galaxy NGC 4461. NGC 4458 and NGC 4461 are interacting with each other.

NGC 4458 may have a supermassive black hole with an estimated mass of 200 million Suns ( M☉).

Nuclear disk
NGC 4458 has an edge-on nuclear disk which is estimated to be about 6 billion years old. The disk likely formed from the merger of a gas-rich galaxy and has been found to have "similar properties to the decoupled cores of bright ellipticals".

Counter-rotating core
Using Hubble images, it has been determined that NGC 4458 has a counter-rotating core.

Metallicity
NGC 4458 has a low metal content but has an overabundance of the element iron.

See also 
 List of NGC objects (4001–5000)
 Messier 86

References

External links 

Elliptical galaxies
Virgo (constellation)
4458
Virgo Cluster
41095
7610
Astronomical objects discovered in 1784